Phnom Sruoch is a district located in Kampong Speu Province in central Cambodia.

Ecology

The largest surface of Kirirom National Park is part of Phnom Sruoch District, Kampong Speu, while another section is in neighboring Koh Kong Province.

The Kirirom National Park is located in the eastern part of the Cardamom Mountains, about 112 km from Phnom Penh. The road from Phnom Penh to Kampong Som runs along the southern boundary of the park.

Among the animals in the park, the following deserve mention: Asian elephant, deer, gaur, banteng, leopard, spotted linsang, pileated gibbon and tiger.

Administration
Phnom Sruoch District is subdivided into 12 communes (khum)

References

Districts of Kampong Speu province